The women's shot put event at the 2003 Asian Athletics Championships was held in Manila, Philippines on September 20.

Results

References

2003 Asian Athletics Championships
Shot put at the Asian Athletics Championships
2003 in women's athletics